Franz Schubert's compositions of 1823 are mostly in the Deutsch catalogue (D) range D 768–798, and include:
 Instrumental works:
 Piano Sonata in E minor, D 769A
 Piano Sonata in A minor, D 784
 Moments musicaux, D 780 (composition dates however uncertain)
 Valses Sentimentales, D 779 (not necessarily all composed in 1823)
 Vocal music:
 Die Verschworenen, D 787 (completed in 1823)
 Fierabras, D 796
 Rosamunde, D 797
 Die schöne Müllerin, D 795
 "Auf dem Wasser zu singen", D 774
 "Du bist die Ruh", D 776
 "Lachen und Weinen", D 777

Table

Legend

List

|-
| 768
| 768
| data-sort-value="096,1827-3" | 96,3(1827)
| data-sort-value="2007,420" | XX, 7No. 420
| data-sort-value="405,00" | IV, 5
| Wandrers Nachtlied, D 768
| data-sort-value="text Uber allen Gipfeln ist Ruh" | Über allen Gipfeln ist Ruh
| data-sort-value="1824-06-01" | beforeJuly 1824
| data-sort-value="Text by Goethe, Johann Wolfgang von, Uber allen Gipfeln ist Ruh" | Text by Goethe; Publ. as Op. 96 No. 3 in 1828
|-
| 769
| 769
| data-sort-value="XXX,1823" | (1823)(1889)
| data-sort-value="1200,018" | XIINo. 18
| data-sort-value="726,7a" | VII/2, 6& 7a
| data-sort-value="German Dances, 02, D 769" | Two German Dances, D 769
| data-sort-value="key I" | Various keys
| data-sort-value="1824-01-01" | before19/12/1823–Jan. 1824
| For piano; No. 2 publ. in 1823
|-
| 994
| 769A
| data-sort-value="ZZZZ" |
| data-sort-value="ZZZZ" |
| data-sort-value="722,11" | VII/2, 2
| Piano Sonata, D 769a
| data-sort-value="key E minor" | E minor
| data-sort-value="1823-01-01" | 
| Allegro; Fragment
|-
| 770
| 770
| data-sort-value="071,1823-0" | 71(1823)
| data-sort-value="2007,424" | XX, 7No. 424
| data-sort-value="403,00" | IV, 3
| Drang in die Ferne
| data-sort-value="text Vater, du glaubst es nicht" | Vater, du glaubst es nicht
| data-sort-value="1823-01-01" | early 1823
| data-sort-value="Text by Leitner, Karl Gottfried von, Vater, du glaubst es nicht" | Text by Leitner; Publ. as Op. 71 in 1827
|-
| 771
| 771
| data-sort-value="022,1823-1" | 22,1(1823)
| data-sort-value="2007,425" | XX, 7No. 425
| data-sort-value="401,0221" | IV, 1a
| data-sort-value="Zwerg, Der" | Der Zwerg
| data-sort-value="text Im truben Licht verschwinden schon die Berge" | Im trüben Licht verschwinden schon die Berge
| data-sort-value="1822-01-01" | 1822?
| data-sort-value="Text by Collin, Matthaus Casimir von, Im truben Licht verschwinden schon die Berge" | Text by Collin, M. C.
|-
| 772
| 772
| data-sort-value="022,1823-2" | 22,2(1823)
| data-sort-value="2007,426" | XX, 7No. 426
| data-sort-value="401,0222" | IV, 1a
| Wehmut, D 772
| data-sort-value="text Wenn ich durch Wald und Fluren geh'" | Wenn ich durch Wald und Fluren geh'
| data-sort-value="1822-01-01" | 1822 or1823?
| data-sort-value="Text by Collin, Matthaus Casimir von, Wenn ich durch Wald und Fluren geh'" | Text by Collin, M. C.
|-
| 773
| 773
| data-sort-value="069,1826-0" | 69(1826)
| data-sort-value="ZZZZ" |
| data-sort-value="715,05" | VII/1, 5No. 5
| Overture to Alfonso und Estrella, D 773
| data-sort-value="ZZZZ" |
| data-sort-value="1823-01-01" | 1823
|-
| 774
| 774
| data-sort-value="072,1823-0" | 72(1823)
| data-sort-value="2007,428" | XX, 7No. 428
| data-sort-value="403,00" | IV, 3
| Auf dem Wasser zu singen
| data-sort-value="text Mitten im Schimmer der spiegelnden Wellen" | Mitten im Schimmer der spiegelnden Wellen
| data-sort-value="1823-01-01" | 1823
| data-sort-value="Text by Stolberg-Stolberg, Friedrich Leopold zu, Mitten im Schimmer der spiegelnden Wellen" | Text by Stolberg-Stolberg; Publ. as Op. 72 in 1827
|-
| 775
| 775
| data-sort-value="059,1826-2" | 59,2(1826)
| data-sort-value="2008,453" | XX, 8No. 453
| data-sort-value="403,00" | IV, 3
| data-sort-value="Dass sie hier gewesen" | Daß sie hier gewesen
| data-sort-value="text Dass der Ostwind Dufte hauchet" | Daß der Ostwind Düfte hauchet
| data-sort-value="1823-01-01" | 1823?
| data-sort-value="Text by Ruckert, Friedrich, Dass der Ostwind Dufte hauchet" | Text by Rückert
|-
| 776
| 776
| data-sort-value="059,1826-3" | 59,3(1826)
| data-sort-value="2008,454" | XX, 8No. 454
| data-sort-value="403,00" | IV, 3
| Du bist die Ruh
| data-sort-value="text Du bist die Ruh, der Friede mild" | Du bist die Ruh, der Friede mild
| data-sort-value="1823-01-01" | 1823
| data-sort-value="Text by Ruckert, Friedrich, Du bist die Ruh, der Friede mild" | Text by Rückert
|-
| 777
| 777
| data-sort-value="059,1826-4" | 59,4(1826)
| data-sort-value="2008,455" | XX, 8No. 455
| data-sort-value="403,00" | IV, 3
| Lachen und Weinen
| data-sort-value="text Lachen und Weinen zu jeglicher Stunde" | Lachen und Weinen zu jeglicher Stunde
| data-sort-value="1823-01-01" | 1823?
| data-sort-value="Text by Ruckert, Friedrich, Lachen und Weinen zu jeglicher Stunde" | Text by Rückert
|-
| 778
| 778
| data-sort-value="060,1826-1" | 60,1(1826)
| data-sort-value="2008,456" | XX, 8No. 456
| data-sort-value="403,00" | IV, 3
| Greisengesang
| data-sort-value="text Der Frost hat mir bereifet" | Der Frost hat mir bereifet
| data-sort-value="1823-01-01" | beforeJune 1823
| data-sort-value="Text by Ruckert, Friedrich, Der Frost hat mir bereifet" | Text by Rückert; For b and piano; Two versions; 2nd, in AGA, is Op. 60 No. 1
|-
| data-sort-value="999.07781" |
| data-sort-value="778.1" | 778A
| data-sort-value="XXX,1969" | (1969)
| data-sort-value="ZZZZ" |
| data-sort-value="413,00" | IV, 13
| data-sort-value="Wallfahrt, Die" | Die Wallfahrt
| data-sort-value="text Meine Tranen im Bussgewand" | Meine Tränen im Bußgewand
| data-sort-value="1823-01-01" | 1823?
| data-sort-value="Text by Ruckert, Friedrich, Meine Tranen im Bussgewand" | Text by Rückert; For b and piano
|-
| data-sort-value="999.07782" |
| data-sort-value="778.2" | 778B
| data-sort-value="ZZZZ" |
| data-sort-value="ZZZZ" |
| data-sort-value="803,01" | VIII, 3
| Ich hab' in mich gesogen
| data-sort-value="text Ich hab' in mich gesogen den Fruhling treu und lieb" | Ich hab' in mich gesogen den Frühling treu und lieb
| data-sort-value="1823-01-01" | 1823?
| data-sort-value="Text by Ruckert, Friedrich, Ich hab' in mich gesogen den Fruhling treu und lieb" | Text by Rückert; Sketch; For ttbb
|-
| 779
| 779
| data-sort-value="050,1825-0" | 50(1825)
| data-sort-value="1200,004" | XIINo. 4& Anh.
| data-sort-value="726,7a" | VII/2, 6& 7a
| data-sort-value="Valses sentimentales, 34" | 34 Valses sentimentales
| data-sort-value="key I" | Various keys
| data-sort-value="1825-11-21" | Feb. 1823–before21/11/1825
| For piano; Early versions of Nos. 1, 2, 4, 8, 9, 12, 14 and 33 in AGA Anh.
|-
| 780
| 780
| data-sort-value="094,1823-0" | 94(1823)(1824)(1828)
| data-sort-value="1100,004" | XI No. 4
| data-sort-value="725,02" | VII/2, 5
| data-sort-value="Moments musicaux, 6" | Six Moments musicaux
| data-sort-value="key I" | Various keys
| data-sort-value="1828-07-11" | beforeDec. 1823–before11/7/1828
| For piano; No. 3 publ. in 1823; No. 6 publ. in 1824; Publ. as Op. 94 in 1828
|-
| 781
| 781
| data-sort-value="XXX,1824" | (1824)(1825)(1889)
| data-sort-value="1200,025" | XIINo. 25& No. 3
| data-sort-value="726,7a" | VII/2, 6& 7a
| data-sort-value="Ecossaises, 12, D 781" | Twelve Écossaises, D 781
| data-sort-value="key I" | Various keys
| data-sort-value="1823-01-01" | January1823
|-
| 782
| 782
| data-sort-value="XXX,1824" | (1824)
| data-sort-value="ZZZZ" |
| data-sort-value="727,a0" | VII/2, 7a
| data-sort-value="Ecossaise, D 782" | Écossaise, D 782
| data-sort-value="key D major" | D major
| data-sort-value="1824-02-21" | before21/2/1824
| For piano
|-
| 783
| 783
| data-sort-value="033,1825-0" | 33(1825)
| data-sort-value="1200,003" | XIINo. 3
| data-sort-value="726,7a" | VII/2, 6& 7a
| data-sort-value="German Dances, 16" | Sixteen German Dances and Two Écossaises
| data-sort-value="key I" | Various keys
| data-sort-value="1825-01-08" | Jan. 1823–before8/1/1825
| For piano; Related to other dances, e.g.  No. 2,  No. 1
|-
| 784
| 784
| data-sort-value="143,1839-0" | 143p(1839)
| data-sort-value="1000,008" | X No. 8
| data-sort-value="722,03" | VII/2, 2No. 12
| Piano Sonata, D 784
| data-sort-value="key A minor" | A minor
| data-sort-value="1823-02-01" | February1823
| Allegro giusto – Andante – Allegro vivace
|-
| 785
| 785
| data-sort-value="XXX,1831" | (1831)
| data-sort-value="2007,421" | XX, 7No. 421
| data-sort-value="413,00" | IV, 13
| data-sort-value="Zurnende Barde, Der" | Der zürnende Barde
| data-sort-value="text Wer wagt's, wer wagt's" | Wer wagt's, wer wagt's
| data-sort-value="1823-02-01" | February1823
|-
| 786
| 786
| data-sort-value="123,1830-0" | 123p(1830)
| data-sort-value="2007,423" | XX, 7No. 423
| data-sort-value="413,00" | IV, 13
| Viola
| data-sort-value="text Schneeglocklein, o Schneeglocklein" | Schneeglöcklein, o Schneeglöcklein
| data-sort-value="1823-03-01" | March 1823
| data-sort-value="Text by Schober, Franz von, Schneeglocklein, o Schneeglocklein" | Text by Schober
|-
| 787
| 787
| data-sort-value="XXX,1889" | (1889)(1964)
| data-sort-value="1503,006" | XV, 3No. 6
| data-sort-value="207,00" | II, 7
| data-sort-value="Verschworenen, Die" | Die Verschworenen, a.k.a. Der haüsliche Krieg
| data-sort-value="theatre (Singspiel in 1 act)" | (Singspiel in one act)
| data-sort-value="1823-04-01" | completedApril 1823
| data-sort-value="Text by Castelli, Ignaz Franz Die Verschworenen" | Text by Castelli; For ssss(s)aatt(t)bbSATB and orchestra; Overture (fragment publ. in 1964) – Nos. 1–11
|-
| 788
| 788
| data-sort-value="XXX,1838" | (1838)
| data-sort-value="2007,427" | XX, 7No. 427
| data-sort-value="413,00" | IV, 13
| Lied, D 788, a.k.a. Die Mutter Erde
| data-sort-value="text Des Lebens Tag ist schwer und schwul" | Des Lebens Tag ist schwer und schwül
| data-sort-value="1823-04-01" | April 1823
| data-sort-value="Text by Stolberg-Stolberg, Friedrich Leopold zu, Des Lebens Tag ist schwer und schwul" | Text by Stolberg-Stolberg
|-
| 789
| 789
| data-sort-value="XXX,1832" | (1832)
| data-sort-value="2007,429" | XX, 7No. 429
| data-sort-value="413,00" | IV, 13
| Pilgerweise
| data-sort-value="text Ich bin ein Waller auf der Erde" | Ich bin ein Waller auf der Erde
| data-sort-value="1823-04-01" | April 1823
| data-sort-value="Text by Schober, Franz von, Ich bin ein Waller auf der Erde" | Text by Schober
|-
| 790
| 790
| data-sort-value="171,1864-0" | 171p(1864)
| data-sort-value="1200,009" | XIINo. 9
| data-sort-value="726,00" | VII/2, 6
| data-sort-value="German Dances, 12, D 790" | Twelve German Dances, D 790, a.k.a. Twelve Ländler
| data-sort-value="key I" | Various keys
| data-sort-value="1823-05-01" | May 1823
| For piano; No. 2 =  No. 1; No. 8 similar to D. 783 No. 1
|-
| 791
| 791
| data-sort-value="XXX,1867" | (1867)
| data-sort-value="ZZZZ" |
| data-sort-value="216,00" | II, 16
| data-sort-value="Rudiger" | Rüdiger
| data-sort-value="theatre (Opera)" | (Opera)
| data-sort-value="1823-05-01" | May 1823
| data-sort-value="Text by Mosel, Ignaz Franz von Rudiger"| Text by Mosel?; For ttTTBB and orchestra; Sketches of two numbers
|-
| 792
| 792
| data-sort-value="XXX,1833" | (1833)
| data-sort-value="2007,430" | XX, 7No. 430
| data-sort-value="413,00" | IV, 13
| data-sort-value="Vergissmeinnicht" | Vergißmeinnicht
| data-sort-value="text Als der Fruhling" | Als der Frühling
| data-sort-value="1823-05-01" | May 1823
| data-sort-value="Text by Schober, Franz von, Als der Fruhling" | Text by Schober
|-
| 793
| 793
| data-sort-value="173,1867-2" | 173p,2(1867)
| data-sort-value="2007,431" | XX, 7No. 431
| data-sort-value="413,00" | IV, 13
| data-sort-value="Geheimnis, Das, D 793" | Das Geheimnis, D 793
| data-sort-value="text Sie konnte mir kein Wortchen sagen 2" | Sie konnte mir kein Wörtchen sagen
| data-sort-value="1823-05-01" | May 1823
| data-sort-value="Text by Schiller, Friedrich, Sie konnte mir kein Wortchen sagen 2" | Text by Schiller
|-
| 794
| 794
| data-sort-value="037,1825-1" | 37,1(1825)(1909)
| data-sort-value="2007,432" | XX, 7No. 432
| data-sort-value="402,0371" | IV, 2a &b No. 6
| data-sort-value="Pilgrim, Der" | Der Pilgrim
| data-sort-value="text Noch in meines Lebens Lenze" | Noch in meines Lebens Lenze
| data-sort-value="1823-05-01" | May 1823
| data-sort-value="Text by Schiller, Friedrich, Noch in meines Lebens Lenze" | Text by Schiller; Two versions (merged into one in AGA): 1st is fragment – 2nd is Op. 37 No. 1
|-
| 795
| 795
| data-sort-value="025,1824-0" | 25(1824)
| data-sort-value="2007,432" | XX, 7Nos.433–452
| data-sort-value="402,2002" | IV, 2a &Anh. No. 2–5
| data-sort-value="Schone Mullerin, Die |  (1. Das Wandern – 2. Wohin? – 3. Halt! – 4. Danksagung an den Bach – 5. Am Feierabend – 6. Der Neugierige – 7. Ungeduld – 8. Morgengruß – 9. Des Müllers Blumen – 10. Tränenregen – 11. Mein! – 12. Pause – 13. Mit dem grünen Lautenbande – 14. Der Jäger – 15. Eifersucht und Stolz – 16. Die liebe Farbe – 17. Die böse Farbe – 18. Trockne Blumen – 19. Der Müller und der Bach – 20. Des Baches Wiegenlied)
| data-sort-value="text Das Wandern ist des Mullers Lust" | 1. Das Wandern ist des Müllers Lust – 2. Ich hört' ein Bächlein rauschen – 3. Eine Mühle seh' ich blinken – 4. War es also gemeint – 5. Hätt' ich tausend Arme zu rühren – 6. Ich frage keine Blume – 7. Ich schnitt' es gern in alle Rinden ein – 8. Guten Morgen, schöne Müllerin – 9. Am Bach viel kleine Blumen stehn' – 10. Wir saßen so traulich beisammen – 11. Bächlein, laß dein Rauschen sein – 12. Meine Laute hab' ich gehängt an die Wand – 13. Schad' um das schöne grüne Band – 14. Was sucht denn der Jäger – 15. Wohin so schnell – 16. In Grün will ich mich kleiden – 17. Ich möchte zieh'n in die Welt hinaus – 18. Ihr Blümlein alle – 19. Wo ein treues Herze – 20. Gute Ruh', gute Ruh'
| data-sort-value="1823-11-01" | October?–November1823
| data-sort-value="Text by Muller, Wilhelm Die schone Mullerin" | Text by Müller, W.
|-
| data-sort-value="796" | 796333
| 796
| data-sort-value="076,1827-0" | 76(1827)(1840)(1867)(1872)(1886)
| data-sort-value="1506,010" | XV, 6No. 10
| data-sort-value="208,01" | II, 8a–c
| Fierabras, also spelled Fierrabras
| data-sort-value="theatre (Opera in 3 acts)" | (Opera in three acts)Vocal numbers include 5. Laß uns mutvoll hoffen and 6b. Was quälst du mich, o Mißgeschick
| data-sort-value="1823-10-02" | 25/5/1823–2/10/1823
|-
| 797
| 797
| data-sort-value="026,1824-0" | 26(1824)(1828)(1866)(1867)(1891)
| data-sort-value="1504,008" | XV, 4No. 8
| data-sort-value="209,00" | II, 9III, 2b Anh. No. 6–7III, 3 No. 31IV, 2a
| Rosamunde, Fürstin von Zypern(1. Entre'acte I – 2. Ballet I – 3a. Entre'acte II – 3b. Romanze a.k.a. Ariette – 4. Geisterchor – 5. Entre'acte III – 6. Hirtenmelodien – 7. Hirtenchor – 8. Jagerchor – 9. Ballet II)
| data-sort-value="theatre (Incidental music for a play in 3 acts)" | (Incidental music for a play in three acts)Vocal numbers: 3b. Der Vollmond strahlt auf Bergeshöhn – 4. In der Tiefe wohnt das Licht – 7. Hier auf den Fluren – 8. Wie lebt sich's so fröhlich im Grünen
| data-sort-value="1823-09-21" | autumn 1823
| data-sort-value="Text by Chezy, Helmina von Rosamunde" | Text by Chézy; For aSATB and orchestra; (Overture: see  and 732) – Nos. 1–9 (Nos. 1 and 5 publ. in 1866, Nos. 2 and 9 publ. in 1867, No. 3b publ. with piano reduction as Op. 26 in 1824, Nos. 4, 7 and 8 publ. with piano reduction in 1828 or 1834, No. 4 publ. 1828; No. 5 partly reused in  No. 3 and Andante of )
|-
| 798
| 798
| data-sort-value="XXX,1897" | (1897)
| data-sort-value="2102,007" | XXI, 2No. 7
| data-sort-value="715,06" | VII/1, 5No. 6
| Overture to Fierabras
| data-sort-value="ZZZZ" |
| data-sort-value="1823-10-03" | after2/10/1823
| Arrangement for piano duet of 's overture
|}

Lists of compositions by Franz Schubert
Compositions by Franz Schubert
Schubert